Somos cómplices is a Spanish daily television series adapting the Chilean telenovela Cómplices. It began airing on 15 September 2009. The original broadcasting run on Antena 3 during the sobremesa slot was swiftly cancelled and moved to Nova.

Premise 
An American man, Harvey Slater, son to millionaires, is told to actually be an adopted son. He thus moves to Spain to find his biological family, only to be conned there by Soledad Méndez, who forges an entire family, the Altamirano, in order to get Harvey's money.

Cast

Production and release 
Shooting locations included a film set in Coín, province of Málaga. Only two episodes aired in September 2009 on Antena 3, after which the remaining episodes were moved to Nova due to the underwhelming start in terms of viewership ratings: 853,000 viewers and a 6.8% share for the first episode broadcast on 15 September and 714,000 viewers and a 5.7% share for the second episode broadcast on 16 September.

References 

Television shows filmed in Spain
2009 Spanish television series debuts
Antena 3 (Spanish TV channel) network series
Spanish-language television shows
Spanish television series based on non-Spanish television series
2000s Spanish drama television series
Spanish telenovelas
Television shows set in Spain
Television series about adoption